The Jersey Shore is the coastal area of New Jersey. Jersey Shore may also refer to:

Jersey Shore (TV series), a reality television series
Jersey Shore Soundtrack, a compilation album based on the series
Jersey Shore Boca, a soccer team based in Toms River, New Jersey
Jersey Shore, Pennsylvania, an inland borough
Jersey Shore sound, a rock music genre